Blanca Guerra Islas (born January 10, 1953) is a Mexican actress. In 1983 she was a member of the jury at the 13th Moscow International Film Festival.

Films 
 La loca de los Milagros (1975)
 Pedro Páramo (1978) - Dolores Preciado
 El servicio (1978) 
 Complot mongol (1978) - Martita
 En la trampa (1979) - Isabel Salas
 Adiós David (1979)
 Mojado Power (1979)
 Estas ruinas que ves (1979)
 El coyote y La Bronca (1980) - Maria Trinidad "La Bronca"
 Mírame con ojos pornográficos (1980) - Sra. Gayosso
 Te solté la rienda (1980)
 Perro Callejero (1980)
 Como México no hay dos (1981)
 La cripta (1981) - Mercedes
 Las siete cucas (1981)
 El mojado remojado (1981) - Xochitl
 Perro Callejero II (1981)  - La chiquis
 Campanas rojas (1982)
 Juan Charrasqueado y Gabino Barrera, su verdadera historia (1982)
 Valentin Lazaña (1982)
 Aquel famoso Remington (1982)
 El tesoro de la muerte sagrada (1982)
 Oro blanco, droga maldita (1982) - Amalia
 El caballito volador (1982)
 Burdel (1982)
 Eréndina (1983)
 Dos de abajo (1983)
 Una pura y dos con sal (1983)
 La fuga de Carrasco (1983)
 Spicy Chile (1983)
 El vengador del 30-06 (1983)
 Sin vergüenza (1984)
 Motel (1984) - Martha Camargo
 Mamá, soy Paquito (1984) - Susana Gomez
 Nocaut (1984) - Lilia Montero
 El billetero (1984) 
 La Segua (1985) - Petronila Quesada
 Sin vergüenza pero honrado (1985)
 La revancha (1985)
 El beso de las brujas (1985)
 Orinoco (1986) - Fifi
 El Cafre (1986)
 Separate Vacations (1986) - Alicia the Working Girl
 ¿Como vez? (1986) - Fish Vendor
 El imperio de la fortuna (1986) - La caponera
 El juego de la muerte (1986)
 Conexión criminal (1987)
 Persecución en las Vegas: "Volveré" (1987) - Olga
 La pandilla infernal (1987) - Yolanda
 Zapata en Chinameca (1987)
 Walker (una historia verdadera) (1987) - Yrena
 Días difíciles (1987) - Luisa Castelar
 Cacería impecable (1988)
 Santa Sangre (1989) - Concha
 Cabalgando de la muerte (1989) - Josefina
 Sandino (1990) - Rossana
 Morir en el golfo (1990) - Leonora
 Ciudad de ciegos (1991) - Ines
 Danzón (1991) - Colorada
 Sonata de luna (1992)
 Mantis religiosa (1992)
 Secuestro a mano armada (1992)
 Principio y fin (1993) - Julia
 Kino: la leyenda del padre negro (1993) - Cortesana 1
 En medio de la nada (1993)
 Peligro imminente (1994) 
 La reina de la noche (1994) - La Jaira
 Salón México (1996) - Almendrita
 Sabor latino (1996) - Norma
 Violeta (1997)
 Un embrujo (1998) - Felipa
 En un claroscuro de la luna (1999) - Maruca
 Su alteza Serenísima (2000) 
 Mientras me muero (2003)
 Niñas mal (2007) - Macarena "Maca" Ribera
 La zona (2007) - Lucia
 Morirse está en hebreo (2007) - Julia Palafox
 Kada kien su karma (2008) - Eva
 Cosas insignificantes (2008) - Mara
 Bajo la sal (2008) - Guadalupe Calva
 Venganza en el Valle de las Muñecas (2009)

Televisión

References

External links 

1953 births
Living people
Mexican child actresses
Mexican telenovela actresses
Mexican television actresses
Mexican film actresses
Ariel Award winners
20th-century Mexican actresses
21st-century Mexican actresses
Actresses from Mexico City
People from Mexico City